Frederick Forsyth Pardee,  (December 29, 1866 – February 4, 1927) was an Ontario barrister and political figure. He represented Lambton West in the Legislative Assembly of Ontario from 1898 to 1902 as a Liberal member and in the House of Commons of Canada from 1905 to 1918 as a Liberal member and from 1918 to 1921 as a member of the Unionist Party. He was a member of the Senate of Canada from 1922 to 1927.

He was born in Sarnia, Ontario in 1866, the son of Timothy Blair Pardee. He was educated at Upper Canada College, studied law and was called to the bar in 1890. He was named King's Counsel in 1908. In 1891, he married Mary E. Johnston. Pardee was elected to the House of Commons in a 1905 by-election held after the death of Thomas George Johnston. He was chief government whip from 1909 from 1911 and chief opposition whip in 1912. He ran unsuccessfully for a seat in the federal parliament as a Liberal in 1921. Pardee was named to the Senate later that year and served until his death in 1927.

References 

 Canadian Parliamentary Guide, 1921, EJ Chambers

External links 

Commemorative biographical record of the county of Lambton, Ontario ..., JH Beers (1906)

1866 births
1927 deaths
Canadian King's Counsel
Canadian senators from Ontario
Liberal Party of Canada MPs
Members of the House of Commons of Canada from Ontario
Ontario Liberal Party MPPs
People from Sarnia